Prasophyllum striatum, commonly known as the streaked leek orchid, is a species of orchid endemic to New South Wales. It has a single thin, tube-shaped leaf and up to ten greenish and whitish flowers with reddish or purplish stripes. It differs from other leek orchids in having a very thin leaf and prominently streaked flowers.

Description
The lateral sepals are a similar size and colour to the dorsal sepal, fused to each other and curve backwards. It curves gently upwards and has wavy edges. There is a raised, creamy-white callus with two parallel ridges in the centre of the labellum and extending almost to its tip. Flowering occurs from March to June.

Taxonomy and naming
Prasophyllum striatum was first formally described in 1810 by Robert Brown and the description was published in Prodromus Florae Novae Hollandiae et Insulae Van Diemen. The specific epithet (striatum) is a Latin word meaning "furrowed", "channelled" or "striped".

In 2004 David Jones and Mark Clements proposed changing the name to Mecopodum striatum but the name has not been accepted by the World Checklist of Selected Plant Families.

Distribution and habitat
The striated leek orchid grows in shallow soil on sandstone and near swamps mainly near the coast from Bulahdelah to Nowra but also in the Blue Mountains.

References

External links 
 
 

striatum
Flora of New South Wales
Endemic orchids of Australia
Plants described in 1810